Bharthari, also known as Bhartrahari, or Bhartrihari, is a 1944 Indian Bollywood film. It was the fifth-highest-grossing Indian film of 1944.

References

External links
 

1944 films
1940s Hindi-language films
Indian black-and-white films